Invasion of Spain can refer to:

Roman conquest of the Iberian Peninsula (218–19 BCE), the conquest of modern-day Spain by the Roman Republic
Migration Period, also known as the Barbarian Invasions, the loss of Roman territory, including Spain, to various invaders
Umayyad conquest of Hispania (711–718), the conquest of modern-day Spain by the Muslim Umayyad Caliphate
Peninsular War (1807–1814), the invasion of Portugal by Spain and France, and later of Spain by France during the Napoleonic Wars 
Louis XVIII's French invasion of Spain (1823), known in Spain as the Hundred Thousand Sons of Saint Louis

See also
Spanish invasion (disambiguation)
History of Spain